Cape John Flagler is a headland in the Wandel Sea, Arctic Ocean, northeast Greenland. Administratively it is part of the Northeast Greenland National Park.

The cape was named in 1900 by Robert Peary after John M. Flagler, one of the members of the Peary Arctic Club in New York.

Geography
Cape John Flagler is located on the southern side of the mouth of Frederick E. Hyde Fjord, Peary Land. 

Cape Bridgman is the headland on the northern side of the fjord entrance and was Robert Peary's easternmost accurate geographic exploration in the north of Greenland, for further south he encountered fog.

References

External links
 GEUS - Peary's Map

Flagler
Peary Land